Crocota is a genus of moths in the family Geometridae.

Species
 Crocota niveata (Scopoli, 1763)
 Crocota ostrogovichi Caradja, 1930
 Crocota peletieraria (Duponchel, 1830)
 Crocota pseudotinctaria Leraut, 1999
 Crocota tinctaria (Hübner, 1799)

References
 Crocota at Markku Savela's Lepidoptera and Some Other Life Forms
 Natural History Museum Lepidoptera genus database

Boarmiini
Moth genera